Jack Farrell (1857–1914), also known as "Moose" Farrell, was a baseball player and manager.

Jack Farrell may also refer to:

 Jack Farrell (outfielder) (1856–1916), outfielder for the Hartford Dark Blues baseball team
 Jack Farrell (infielder) (1892–1918), infielder for the Chicago Whales baseball team
 Jack Farrell (footballer, born 1873) (1873–1947), English footballer
 Jack Farrell (Australian footballer) (1872–1953), Australian rules footballer

See also 
 John Farrell (disambiguation)